Maurice Bertram Priestley (15 March 1933 – 15 June 2013) was a professor of statistics in the School of Mathematics, University of Manchester. He gained his first degree at the University of Cambridge and went on to gain a Ph.D. from the University of Manchester.

He was known especially for his work on time series analysis, especially spectral analysis and wavelet analysis. He was a longstanding editor of the Journal of Time Series Analysis, a special edition of which was published in his honour in 1993.
Less well-known but equally important was his work with M.T.Chao on nonparametric function fitting.

Selected publications

References

External links

1933 births
2013 deaths
Academics of the University of Manchester
People educated at Manchester Grammar School